Sinan's Wedding, directed by Ole Christian Madsen, is a 1997 film about a young Turkish immigrant named Sinan, who is arranged to marry the beautiful Gul.

References

Films directed by Ole Christian Madsen
1997 romantic drama films
1997 films
Danish romantic drama films